The following is a list of anti-sexual assault organizations in the United States. These organizations typically support the rape crisis centers in their state or nationwide.

International

MaleSurvivor is a non-profit organization committed to preventing, healing, and eliminating all forms of sexual victimization of boys and men through support, treatment, research, education, advocacy, and activism. Formed in 1995, MaleSurvivor has an international membership of over 14,000 registered members from over 200 countries in the world.

U.S. nationwide
(in alphabetical order)
1in6 is a national nonprofit dedicated to helping male-identifying survivors of sexual abuse and assault. The organization also serves family members, friends, partners, and service providers by providing information and support resources on the web and in the community.
 Asian Pacific Institute on Gender-Based Violence works to study different forms of gender-based violence in Asian-American communities and provide resources to survivors.
 bloom365 works to educate, train, and empower youth to identify and build healthy relationships in their lives.
 End Rape on Campus works to end campus sexual violence through direct support for survivors and their communities; prevention through education; and policy reform at the campus, local, state, and federal levels.
 HEAL - is a self-directed, interactive website that provides a 14-session curriculum that educates, has behavior monitoring systems, meditations, national virtual support groups, and an interactive survivor community for survivors of sexual abuse. For survivors 18 years and older. HEAL also provides the first and only online community survivors can go to anonymously for help. https://www.healfromabuse.com/
Military Rape Crisis Center (proposed for the U.S. military; see military sexual trauma)
 National Sexual Violence Resource Center (NSVRC) Mission is "to provide leadership in preventing and responding to sexual violence through collaborating, sharing and creating resources, and promoting research."
 The One Love Foundation or The Yeardley Reynolds Love Foundation was created in 2010 to honor the memory of Yeardley Love, a UVA senior who was beaten to death by her ex-boyfriend just weeks short of graduation. The Foundation is more popularly known as One Love, with "One" representing the number that Yeardley wore on her jersey during her high school and college lacrosse career. 
 Rape, Abuse & Incest National Network (RAINN) — sponsors the National Sexual Assault Hotline (1.800.656-HOPE)
 SafeBAE (Before Anyone Else) - a student-focused, survivor-driven organization whose mission is to raise awareness about sexual assault in middle and high schools and student's rights under Title IX. SafeBAE is focused on preventing dating violence and sexual assault by giving students the tools to change peer culture, end harassing re-victimization, and advocate for consent and safe relationship education.
Sexual Assault Awareness (SAA)  National psychotherapy and training organization founded in 2014.

Puerto Rico
 Puerto Rico Rape Crisis Center (unconfirmed)

U.S. Territories and other

Guam
 Guam Healing Hearts Crisis Center (unconfirmed)
 Guam Coalition Against Sexual Assault and Family Violence

Virgin Islands
 Virgin Islands Domestic Violence and Sexual Assault Council (DVSAC)

By U.S. state

Alabama
 Alabama Coalition Against Rape (ACAR)

Alaska
 Alaska Network on Domestic Violence & Sexual Assault (ANDVSA)

Arizona
See also 
 Arizona Coalition to End Sexual and Domestic Violence (ACESDV) 
 Arizona Sexual Assault Network (AzSAN) 
 Arizona South Asians for Safe Families (ASAFSF)

Arkansas
 Arkansas Coalition Against Sexual Assault (ACASA)  Jul.9, 2013

California
 End Rape On Campus (EROC), based in Los Angeles.
 Student Coalition Against Rape (SCAR); founded in 2013 at the University of Southern California before transitioning to becoming a national organization.
 Roar as One (ROAR AS ONE) Rise, Organize, Act, Restore Justice); founded in 2017, based in Los Angeles
 ValorUS

Colorado
 Colorado Coalition Against Sexual Assault (CCASA) 
 Sexual Assault Services Organization (SASO)
 Sexual Assault Victim Advocate (SAVA Center)

Connecticut
 Connecticut Alliance to End Sexual Violence

D.C.
 D.C. Rape Crisis Center

Delaware
 CONTACT Delaware, Inc. (unconfirmed)

Florida
 Florida Council Against Sexual Violence (FCASV)

Georgia
 Georgia Network to End Sexual Assault (GNESA)

Hawaii
 Hawaii Coalition Against Sexual Assault (no website)

Idaho
 Idaho Coalition Against Sexual & Domestic Violence

Illinois
 Illinois Coalition Against Sexual Assault (ICASA) 
 Zacharias Sexual Abuse Center (Lake County, Illinois)

Indiana
 Indiana Coalition to End Sexual Assault & Human Trafficking (ICESAHT)

Iowa
 Iowa Coalition Against Sexual Assault (IOWACASA)

Kansas
 Kansas Coalition Against Sexual and Domestic Violence (KCSDV)

Kentucky
 Kentucky Association of Sexual Assault Programs, Inc. (KASAP) https://www.kasap.org/

Louisiana
 Louisiana Foundation Against Sexual Assault (LAFASA)

Maine
 Maine Coalition Against Sexual Assault (MECASA)

Maryland
 Maryland Coalition Against Sexual Assault (MCASA) 
 SARC Sexual Assault/Spouse Abuse Resource Center www.sarc-maryland.org

Massachusetts
Jane Doe Inc. - The Massachusetts Coalition Against Sexual Assault and Domestic Violence 
 Pathways for Change, Inc.

Michigan
 Michigan Coalition Against Domestic and Sexual Violence (MCADSV) 
 Uniting Three Fires Against Violence (UTFAV)

Minnesota
 Minnesota Coalition Against Sexual Assault (MNCASA) 
 Minnesota Indian Women's Sexual Assault Coalition (MIWSAC) 
 Minnesota Center Against Violence and Abuse (MINCAVA) 
 Day One Minnesota Domestic Violence Crisis Line (Hotline: 1-866-223-1111)  
 OutFront Minnesota Anti-Violence Program (LGBT-specific, Hotline: 800-800-0350) 
 Mending The Sacred Hoop (Native American-specific) 
 Violence Free Minnesota

Mississippi
 Mississippi Coalition Against Sexual Assault (MCASA)

Missouri
 Missouri Coalition Against Sexual Assault (MoCASA)  No such page was found Nov 5, 2012
 Missouri Coalition Against Domestic and Sexual Violence (MOCADSV)

Montana
 Montana Coalition Against Domestic & Sexual Violence (MCADSV)

Nebraska
 Nebraska Domestic Violence Sexual Assault Coalition (NDVSAC)

Nevada
 Nevada Coalition To End Domestic and Sexual Violence (NCEDSV)

New Hampshire
 New Hampshire Coalition Against Domestic and Sexual Violence (NHCADSV)

New Jersey
 New Jersey Coalition Against Sexual Assault (NJCASA)

New Mexico
 New Mexico Coalition of Sexual Assault Programs, Inc.

New York
 New York State Coalition Against Sexual Assault (NYSCASA)

North Carolina
 North Carolina Coalition Against Sexual Assault (NCCASA)

North Dakota
 CAWS North Dakota

Ohio
 Ohio Alliance to End Sexual Violence (OAESV) 
 Cleveland Rape Crisis Center

Oklahoma
 Oklahoma Coalition Against Domestic Violence and Sexual Assault (OCADVSA)

Oregon
 Oregon Coalition Against Domestic and Sexual Violence (OCADSV) 
 Oregon Attorney General's Sexual Assault Task Force

Pennsylvania
 Pennsylvania Coalition Against Rape (PCAR)

Rhode Island
 Rhode Island Coalition Against Domestic Violence 
 Day One

South Carolina
 ri-County S.P.E.A.K.S. 
 South Carolina Coalition Against Domestic Violence and Sexual Assault (SCCADVSA)

South Dakota
 South Dakota Coalition Against Domestic Violence and Sexual Assault (SDCADVSA) 
 South Dakota Network Against Family Violence and Sexual Assault

Tennessee
 Silent No Longer Tennessee 
 Tennessee Coalition Against Domestic & Sexual Violence 
 Sexual Assault Center

Texas
 Texas Association Against Sexual Assault (TAASA)

Utah
 Citizens Against Physical and Sexual Abuse (CAPSA) 
 Rape Recovery Center, formerly SL Rape Crisis Center 
 UCASA

Vermont
 Vermont Network Against Domestic Violence and Sexual Assault 
 Stairs on Stares

Virginia
 Rappahannock Council Against Sexual Assault (RCASA) 
 Virginia Sexual and Domestic Violence Action Alliance (VSDVAA)

Washington
 Washington Coalition of Sexual Assault Programs (WCSAP)

West Virginia
 West Virginia Foundation for Rape Information and Services (FRIS)

Wisconsin
 Wisconsin Coalition Against Sexual Assault (WCASA)  
Interactive Map to find Wisconsin Sexual Assault Service Providers
 ASTOP Sexual Abuse Center (Fond du Lac, Green Lake & Waushara Counties)
Dane County Rape Crisis Center

Wyoming
 Wyoming Coalition Against Domestic Violence and Sexual Assault (WCADVSA)

See also
Victim Rights Law Center
National Organization for Women (NOW) Woman of Courage Award Winners
Rape
Sexual assault

References

External links
Directory of U.S. advocacy organizations and coalitions

+
+
Sexual assault